Bitoma is a genus of cylindrical bark beetles in the family Zopheridae. There are about 15 described species in Bitoma.

Species
 Bitoma brevipes (Sharp, 1894)
 Bitoma carinata (LeConte, 1863)
 Bitoma crenata (Fabricius, 1775)
 Bitoma discolor Schaeffer, 1907
 Bitoma exarata (Pascoe, 1863)
 Bitoma gracilis Sharp, 1894
 Bitoma granulata (Blatchley, 1910)
 Bitoma neglecta Stephan, 1989
 Bitoma ornata (LeConte, 1858)
 Bitoma parallela (Sharp, 1885)
 Bitoma pinicola Schaeffer, 1907
 Bitoma quadricollis (Horn, 1885)
 Bitoma quadriguttata (Say, 1826)
 Bitoma sulcata (LeConte, 1858)
 Bitoma vittata Schaeffer, 1907

References

Further reading

 
 
 

Zopheridae